Admiral George Stewart, 8th Earl of Galloway,  (24 March 1768 – 27 March 1834), styled Lord Garlies between 1773 and 1806, was a British naval commander and politician.

Background
Garlies was the eldest son of John Stewart, 7th Earl of Galloway, and Anne, daughter of Sir James Dashwood, 2nd Baronet, and attended Westminster School before embarking on a career in the Royal Navy.

Military career
Garlies entered the navy at an early age, serving as a 13-year-old midshipman under the command of his uncle, Commodore Keith Stewart at the Battle of Dogger Bank in August 1781, and also in the Great Siege of Gibraltar in 1782. In 1789 he was promoted to lieutenant, serving in the frigate  in the Mediterranean. He returned to England in early 1790, when appointed commander of the fire ship . He was promoted to post-captain on 30 April 1793, and soon after was appointed to the frigate , serving in the West Indies, and being wounded while covering the landing of the army at Guadaloupe in April 1794, and was then sent with detachments of troops to accept the surrender of the islands of Marie-Galante and La Désirade.

In 1795 he took command of the frigate , and took Sir John Jervis out from England to assume command in the Mediterranean. Commanding a division of four frigates and a sloop, he engaged the Spanish ship of line San Francisco de Asís in the action of 25 January 1797, in which he was forced to withdraw. He served in the area until the Battle of Cape St Vincent in February 1797. After the battle Lively carried Sir Robert Calder, with the account of the victory, and Lord Minto, Viceroy of Corsica, and his suite, who were on board during the battle, back to England.

Around November 1799 Garlies commissioned the frigate , and commanded her in the Channel and on the coast of Ireland until early 1801, making several captures and recaptures: 
 On 17 May 1800 Hussar, the frigate Loire and the schooner  recaptured the ship Princess Charlotte, and captured the French schooner La Francoise. 
 On 2 March 1801 Hussar captured the French schooner Le General Bessieres.
 On 12 April 1801 Hussar recaptured the ship James of Liverpool.

Following the renewal of hostilities in May 1803 he commanded the ship , and sat on the Board of Admiralty in between May 1805 and February 1806. Galloway saw no further active service, but was promoted to Rear-Admiral on 31 July 1810; to Vice Admiral on 12 August 1819; and to Admiral on 22 July 1830.

Political career
Apart from his military career Garlies also sat as a Member of Parliament. He was first elected in 1790 for the constituency of Saltash, and served until vacating his seat in favour of his brother William in February 1795. He returned to Parliament when elected MP for Cockermouth on 22 July 1805, and then sat for Haslemere after the 1806 election, but was shortly after obliged to quit his seat following the death of his father on 13 November, when he became the Earl of Galloway, and moved to the House of Lords.

He served as Lord Lieutenant of Kirkcudbright from 26 December 1794 to 1807, and from 1820 to 1828, and of Wigtownshire from 28 March 1807 to 1828. On 30 May 1814 he was invested as a member of the Order of the Thistle. He also served as vice-president of the Board of Agriculture in 1815.

Family
In April 1797 he married Lady Jane Paget, the daughter of Henry Paget, 1st Earl of Uxbridge, and sister of Henry Paget, 1st Marquess of Anglesey. They had eight children:
 Lady Jane Stewart (1798–1844), m. George Spencer-Churchill, 6th Duke of Marlborough.
 Lady Caroline Stewart (1799–1857)
 Hon Randolph Stewart, later 9th Earl of Galloway (1800–1873)
 Lady Louisa Stewart (1804–1889), m. William Duncombe, 2nd Baron Feversham.
 Hon Arthur Stewart (1805–1806)
 Hon Alan Stewart (1807–1808)
 Lady Helen Stewart (1810–1813)
 Vice Admiral Hon Keith Stewart CB (1814– 15 September 1879), m. Mary FitzRoy, daughter of Charles Augustus FitzRoy. Had issue, 9 daughters, and 1 son.

References

External links
 

1768 births
1834 deaths
8
Knights of the Thistle
Royal Navy admirals
Royal Navy personnel of the American Revolutionary War
Royal Navy personnel of the French Revolutionary Wars
Royal Navy personnel of the Napoleonic Wars
UK MPs 1802–1806
Galloway, E8
British MPs 1790–1796
Members of the Parliament of Great Britain for Saltash
Members of the Parliament of the United Kingdom for English constituencies
UK MPs 1806–1807
Lords of the Admiralty